Jeremy Ward is a British classical bassoonist specialising in performances on period instruments. He was a student of Charles Cracknell and a member of the National Youth Orchestra. He went on to study music at King's College, Cambridge. He has served as principal bassoonist with the leading period orchestras of London, performing under Sir John Eliot Gardiner, Sir Roger Norrington, Trevor Pinnock, and Christopher Hogwood.

References

Living people
English classical bassoonists
Alumni of King's College, Cambridge
Academics of Trinity College of Music
Year of birth missing (living people)